Alfred D. Boyer Stadium is a baseball venue in Macomb, Illinois, United States.  It is home to the Western Illinois Leathernecks baseball team of the NCAA Division I Summit League.  

The stadium opened on May 6, 2006 and has a seating capacity of 500.  The stadium is named for Alfred D. Boyer, Western Illinois Class of 1972, whose $150,000 donation allowed the facility to be built.  The venue features a press box, chairback seating, a Daktronics scoreboard, and 60-foot-long dugouts.

See also
 Western Illinois Leathernecks baseball
 Western Illinois Leathernecks
 List of NCAA Division I baseball venues

References

External links
 Alfred D. Boyer Stadium - The Official Athletics Site of the Western Illinois University Leathernecks

Baseball venues in Illinois
College baseball venues in the United States
Western Illinois Leathernecks baseball
Western Illinois Leathernecks sports venues
2006 establishments in Illinois
Sports venues completed in 2006